Chromosome 1 open reading frame 68, or C1orf68, is a human gene which encodes for skin-specific protein 32.  C1orf68 gene is expressed in the skin, is apart of the epidermal differentiation complex, and potentially plays a role in epidermal cornification, and epidermal barrier function.

Gene 
C1orf68 is mapped on the plus strand of chromosome 1 at 1q21.3, that spans 949 base pairs in the human genome.  Other aliases include Late envelope protein 7 (LEP7), XP32, Skin-Specific Protein (Xp32). This gene has only 1 exon, and no introns. It is apart of the Epidermal differentiation complex (1q21).

Protein 

Skin-specific protein 32 has only one isoform, and has a sequence length of 250 amino acids. It has a molecular mass of 26 kDa, and a predicted pI value of 8.41. It was noted that the amino acid sequence contained high levels of cysteine relative to other human protein sequences.

Domains, repeats 

Skin-specific protein 32 has one domain, PRK10264, which is a DNA translocase FtsK. It also contains a cysteine rich region, which is shown to be conserved across most mammal orthologs, excluding Monotremes.

The protein sequence also contains a repeat sequence, the three continuous repeat sequences are located from amino acid position Gln65 to Cys127. The repeat sequences can be observed in the conceptual translation on the right. They are within the DNA translocase Ftsk domain and the cysteine rich region. The repeat sequences are conserved across mammal orthologs. The conservation of each individual amino acid can be observed in the LOGO below.

Gene level regulation

Promoter 
One promoter was identified for C1orf68 using ElDorado Genomatics. This promoter, GXP_1818199, spans 1,040 bases and overlaps C1orf68 by 40 bases. Since C1orf68 does not contain a 5'-UTR, the promoter overlaps the start codon, which can be visualized in the diagram below.

Expression pattern 

C1orf68 is expressed in a select few tissues, specifically in the skin and in breast tissue. In humans, C1orf68 protein abundance is moderate.  In terms of specific cell types within the skin, C1orf68 is expressed in suprabasal keratinocytes, which are a type of epithelial cell. It has also been noted that C1orf68 is moderately expressed in stratum corneum  and granular layer of skin. This could be because the protein remains in the cell as it differentiates and matures.

Transcript level regulation 

C1orf68 does not contain a 5'-UTR, but does contain a 3'-UTR. The predicted secondary structure of C1orf68's 3'-UTR mRNA contains various stem loops. The stem loop containing PUM2 RNA protein binding site, which was shown in all of the predicted structures created by mFold.

Protein level regulation

Subcellular Localization 
Skin-specific protein 32 is predicted to be localized in the cytoplasm. The protein has been shown to occupy the cytoplasm within skin cells, which can be observed in the immunofluorescence staining in Human Protein Atlas, Subcellular.

Evolution

Paralogs 
There are no known paralogs of C1orf68.

Orthologs 
C1orf68 has a range of orthologs within mammals, and some amphibians, specifically shown in two Frog species. The ortholog sequence similarity percentages range from 96-23%. There are no orthologs in birds, fish, and reptiles but there was a few in amphibians. Additionally, within the Mammals, there was no orthologs in Cetacea (marine mammals). The most highly conserved amino acids across mammals and amphibians with available sequences are Pro61, Pro73, Pro126, Pro182, which are all proline amino acids. 

The figure below shows more information about the evolutionary rate of C1orf68 throughout its orthologs. The rate of evolution of C1orf68 was observed to be fast when comparing to cytochrome c and fibrinogen alpha. This observation is determined since C1orf68 appears to evolve at a similar rate to fibrinogen alpha, which serves as a standard for rapidly evolving genes.

Interacting proteins

Transcription factor binding sites 
Three different transcription factors  for C1orf68 were predicted and obtained from MatInspector Genomatics.

GRHL2 
Grainyhead-like 2 has been shown to impair keratinocyte differentiation through transcriptional inhibition of the gene in the epidermal differentiation complex. Also showed enhanced protein and mRNA levels in chronic skin lesions, such as in psoriasis.

ZEB1 
Zinc finger E-box-binding homeobox 1 has been shown to regulate corneal epithelial terminal phenotype.

GATA3 
GATA-binding factor 3 has been shown localized in the cytoplasm and nucleus of proliferating keratinocytes but only in the nucleus in differentiated keratinocytes. It has also been shown that GATA3 induces differentiation of primary keratinocytes, and suggested that it may regulate human interfollicular epidermal renewal.

Protein-protein interactions 
Other potential proteins that interact with C1orf68 are located in the table below. These proteins were selected from the results from prediction tools because of their participation in the epidermal cornified envelope, the location of their gene within the epidermal differentiation complex, and the localization to the cytoplasm.

Clinical significance

Psoriasis 
C1orf68 is expressed differently when we look at samples of healthy skin, skin with psoriasis without lesions and skin with psoriasis with lesions. In one study, it was suggested that proteins with significant differences in expression in skin with psoriasis without lesions and skin with psoriasis with lesions, could contribute to maintaining the non-lesional state and may add to our understanding of lesion formation.

References 

Genes on human chromosome 1